The Second Legislative Assembly of the Wisconsin Territory convened from , to , from , to , and from , to , in regular session.

Major events
 September 4, 1839: The Battle of Kowloon marked the start of the First Opium War between the United Kingdom of Great Britain and Ireland and the Qing dynasty.
 July 1, 1839: Enslaved Africans aboard the Amistad rebelled at took control of the ship.
 December 1839: Horatio N. Wells appointed the 2nd Attorney General for the Wisconsin Territory.
 December 2, 1839: The first edition of the Madison Express was published at Madison.
 December 6, 1839: The first national convention of the Whig Party was held at Harrisburg, Pennsylvania, and nominated General William Henry Harrison for President of the United States.
 October 3December 2, 1840: William Henry Harrison elected President of the United States.

Major legislation
 December 20, 1839: An Act to amend an act entitled "An Act to provide for and regulate General Elections," 1839 Wisc. Terr. Act 1.  Changed the date of general elections to the fourth Monday in September.
 January 8, 1840: An Act to prevent the sale of intoxicating liquors to Indians, 1840 Wis. Terr. Act 17.  
 January 11, 1840: An Act to provide for taking the census, or enumeration of the inhabitants of this Territory, and to fix the time of holding an extra session of the Legislative Assembly, 1839 Wis. Terr. Act 27.
 January 13, 1840: An Act limiting the term of office of all officers of this Territory, not now limited by law, 1839 Wisc. Terr. Act 50.  Set a 2-year term for all Wisconsin Territory offices not previously described by law.

Sessions
 1st session: November 26, 1838December 22, 1838
 2nd session: January 21, 1839March 11, 1839
 3rd session: December 2, 1839January 13, 1840
 Extra session: August 3, 1840August 14, 1840

Leadership

Council President
 William Bullen - during the 1st session
 James Collins - during the 2nd and 3rd sessions
 William A. Prentiss - during the extra session

Speaker of the House of Representatives
 John Wilford Blackstone Sr. (W) - during the 1st session
 Lucius Israel Barber (W) - during the 2nd session
 Edward V. Whiton (W) - during the 3rd session
 Nelson Dewey (D) - during the extra session

Members

Members of the Council
Members of the Council for the Second Legislative Assembly:

Members of the House of Representatives
Members of the House of Representatives for the Second Legislative Assembly:

Employees

Council employees
 Secretary: 
 George Beatty, all sessions
 Sergeant-at-Arms:
 Stephen N. Ives, 1st & 2nd sessions
 Thomas J. Noyes, 3rd session
 Gilbert Knapp, extra session

House employees
 Chief Clerk: 
 John Catlin, all sessions
 Sergeant-at-Arms:
 Thomas Morgan, 1st session
 Thomas J. Moorman, 2nd session
 James Durley, 3rd session
 D. M. Whitney, extra session

References

External links
 Wisconsin Legislature website

1838 in Wisconsin Territory
1839 in Wisconsin Territory
1840 in Wisconsin Territory
1838 in Wisconsin
1840 in Wisconsin
1830s in Wisconsin
1840s in Wisconsin
Wisconsin
Wisconsin
Wisconsin
Wisconsin legislative sessions